Banbhori (also spelt as Banbhauri) is a village in Hisar (also known as Hissar) district of Haryana state of northwestern India.

Shri Durga Mata Bhramari Mandir
Shri Durga Mata Bhramari Mandir, Banbhori run by the Government of Haryana's Shri Durga Mata Mandir Banbhori Temple Trust, is an ancient temple dedicated to Durga with annual donation receipts of INR15 crore. In November 2017, Government of Haryana cabinet brought this privately managed temple under the ownership of government trust so that the donations can be used for welfare of local populace.

References

External links
 Banbhori Temple - The Divine India

Villages in Hisar district